Dennis Edmonton (born Dennis Eugene McCrohan; 21 April 1943), also known by the stage name Mars Bonfire, is a Canadian rock musician and songwriter, best known for writing the hit song "Born to Be Wild" for Steppenwolf.

Career
Born Dennis Eugene McCrohan, he and his brother Jerry changed their surnames to Edmonton in the early 1960s. The brothers were part of the band the Sparrows, which later evolved into Steppenwolf. Another member of the Sparrows was Bruce Palmer, who later became a member of Buffalo Springfield.

Bonfire embarked on a solo career, while his brother Jerry became the drummer for Steppenwolf. After leaving the band, he often collaborated with Kim Fowley, co-writing and recording on the recordings of Fowley and artists associated with Fowley.

On 22 June 2015, Bonfire was awarded the Cultural Impact Award by SOCAN at the 2015 SOCAN Awards in Toronto for the song "Born to be Wild".

Personal life
Bonfire was a prolific hiker in Southern California for many years. He has completed the Hundred Peaks Section list 25 times. He was noted by the Los Angeles Times for his "affability and flexibility" as a hike leader.

Discography
Songs by Mars Bonfire that were recorded by Steppenwolf include:
"Born to Be Wild" (Steppenwolf, 1968)
"Faster Than The Speed of Life" (The Second, 1968)
"Ride with Me" (For Ladies Only, 1971)
"Tenderness" (For Ladies Only, 1971)
"The Night Time's for You" (co-write w/Morgan Cavett, For Ladies Only, 1971)
"Caroline (Are You Ready for the Outlaw World)" (Hour of the Wolf, 1975)

Albums:
 Mars Bonfire (1968)
 Faster Than the Speed of Life (1969)

References

External links
 
 

Canadian songwriters
Canadian rock guitarists
Canadian male guitarists
1943 births
Living people
Musicians from Oshawa
Steppenwolf (band)